Loisey-Culey is a former commune in the Meuse department in Lorraine in north-eastern France. It was formed in 1973 by the merger of Loisey and Culey, and was disbanded in 2014.

See also
Communes of the Meuse department

References

Loiseyculey